ETC Bollywood Business Channel is a Bollywood trade television channel. The channel caters to audiences in the Asia Pacific region and has shows that are hosted in English and Hindi. The channel features reviews, previews, box office collections, details of new and upcoming releases, trade speculations of Hindi films. Talks with Bollywood actors, trade pundits, directors, producers, distributors and film marketers etc. give audiences the insights about a particular film from a business perspective. Well known film critic, Komal Nahta stepped into film critic Taran Adarsh's shoes as a host of one of the most prominent shows of the channel, B Biz Reviews in April 2010.

ETC is an India-based satellite television channel based in Mumbai, Maharashtra, ETC was a 24-hour Indian Music Channel.

Zee Network was founded by Subhash Chandra and was launched in India on 1 October 1992.

Network slogans
 'It's all about Bollywood - Movies, Music, Masala’
 'The Business of Bollywood’

External links
 ETC Bollywood Business by Komal Nahta

References

Television channels and stations established in 1999
1999 establishments in Maharashtra